Breakin' (also known as Breakdance in the United Kingdom and Break Street '84 in other regions) is a 1984 American breakdancing-themed musical film directed by Joel Silberg and written by Charles Parker and Allen DeBevoise based on a story by Parker, DeBevoise and Gerald Scaife.

The film's setting was inspired by a 1983 documentary titled Breakin' 'n' Enterin, set in the multi-racial hip hop club Radio-Tron, based out of MacArthur Park in Los Angeles. Many of the artists and dancers from said documentary, including Ice-T (who makes his film debut as a club MC), and Michael "Boogaloo Shrimp" Chambers, went straight from Breakin' 'n' Enterin' to star in Breakin'.

The film's soundtrack featured the hits "Breakin'... There's No Stopping Us" by Ollie & Jerry, "Freakshow on the Dance Floor" by The Bar-Kays and the UK Top 20 hit "Body Work" by Hot Streak.

Breakin' was one of the final Cannon film productions released by MGM/UA. After release, MGM and Cannon dissolved their distribution deal, reportedly over the potentially X-rated content in John Derek's film Bolero and MGM's then-policy of not theatrically releasing X-rated material, forcing Cannon to become an in-house distribution company once again. Because of this, Breakin' is considered to be the final financially profitable film released by Cannon.

Breakin' was released to theaters on May 4, 1984, and despite receiving negative reviews from critics, it was a box office success. A theatrical sequel entitled Breakin' 2: Electric Boogaloo, was released later in the same year.

Plot
Protagonist Kelly "Special K" Bennett is a young dancer training under instructor Franco in Venice, California. Through her friend Adam, Kelly meets two street dancers, Ozone and Turbo on the boardwalk at Venice Beach. Kelly is enamored with their dancing, and all three become friends. This leads to their becoming their own dance troupe.

Franco tells Kelly that breakdancing is low-class and not a real art. He is disrespectful to Ozone and Turbo, and makes inappropriate advances on Kelly. She quits training with Franco. Later, Kelly attends a dance audition and is shut down by harsh directors.

Kelly then wanders to a breakdancing event where she finds Ozone and Turbo in the midst of a dance battle that they eventually lose against rivals "Electro Rock." Adam convinces Ozone and Turbo to teach Kelly how to breakdance. After training for a while, the three defeat Electro Rock. Kelly convinces the troupe to enroll in a dance competition. Kelly's agent friend, James, sees what the group can do and agrees to back them.

The competition requirements are traditional, socially respected styles of dance. The troupe walks before the judges in tuxedos, top hats and white gloves to give the impression of traditional dancers. Just before the audition starts, they rip off the sleeves of their shirts and show their true style. The judges are initially shocked and disapproving. Yet within two minutes of their audition, the judges recognize the troupe's talent and allow them to continue. The troupe earns a standing ovation from the judges and win the competition. The troupe's popularity skyrockets, and all three members continue dancing professionally and in the community.

In a mid-credits scene, Special K, Ozone, and Turbo meet James some time after the competition, who informs them about a new phenomenon known as "the electric boogaloo."

Cast

 Lucinda Dickey as Kelly "Special K" Bennett
 Adolfo "Shabba Doo" Quiñones as Orlando "Ozone" Barco
 Michael "Boogaloo Shrimp" Chambers as Tony "Turbo" Ainley
 Ice T as Rap Talker
 Chris "The Glove" Taylor as Club Radiotron DJ
 Ben Lokey as Franco
 Christopher McDonald as James Wilcox
 Phineas Newborn III as Adam
 Vidal "Lil Coco" Rodriguez as Hot Tot
 Bruno "Pop N' Taco" Falcon as Electro Rock 1
 Timothy "Popin' Pete" Solomon as Electro Rock 2
 Ana "Lollipop" Sanchez as Electro Rock 3
 Cooley Jaxson as himself, A Dancer
 Peter Bromilow as Judge
 Michel Qissi as Background Dancing Spectator (uncredited)
 Jean-Claude Van Damme as Spectator in First Dance Sequence (uncredited) 
Richie Cerrone as Lil R Background Dancer (uncredited)

Production
According to the 2014 documentary Electric Boogaloo: The Wild, Untold Story of Cannon Films, Menahem Golan of Cannon Films was inspired to create this film after his daughter saw a breakdancer perform in Venice Beach, California. Golan pressured the production crew to complete the film before Orion Pictures released their breakdancing film Beat Street.

Erik Abbey was the choreographer for the breakdancing scenes.

Soundtrack
The soundtrack of the film was released by Polydor Records in 1984. The album contains the first performance on an album by rapper Ice-T (who had previously released some 12" singles), produced by DJ Chris "The Glove" Taylor & David Storrs.

Track listing

Despite not being included on the official soundtrack, the film also features the previously released songs "Boogie Down" by Al Jarreau, "Tour de France" by Kraftwerk, "Beat Box" by Art of Noise and "Tibetan Jam" by Chris "The Glove" Taylor.

Weekly charts
{| class="wikitable sortable plainrowheaders" style="text-align:center"
|+ Weekly chart performance for Breakin! scope="col"| Chart (1984)
! scope="col"| Peakposition
|-
! scope="row"| Australian Albums (Kent Music Report)
| 6
|-

|-

|-

|-
! scope="row"| European Albums (Eurotipsheet)
| 8
|-
! scope="row"| Finnish Albums (Suomen virallinen lista)
| 25
|-

|-

|-

|-

|-

|-

|-

|}

Year-end charts
{| class="wikitable sortable plainrowheaders" style="text-align:center"
|+ Year-end chart performance for Breakin! scope="col"| Chart (1984)
! scope="col"| Position
|-
! scope="row"| Australian Albums (Kent Music Report)
| 64
|-
! scope="row"| UK Albums (Gallup)
| 51
|-
! scope="row"| US Billboard 200
| 78
|-
! scope="row"| US Soundtrack Albums (Billboard)
| 6
|-
! scope="row"| US Top R&B/Hip-Hop Albums (Billboard)
| 33
|}

Release

Box office
Breakin''' opened in 1,069 venues on May 4, 1984 and outgrossed Sixteen Candles, which had more screens (1,240). The film ranked number one in the box office, earning $6,047,686. By the end of its run, the film grossed $38,682,707 in the domestic box office, making it the eighteenth top-grossing film of 1984.

Critical reception
Roger Ebert, who reviewed the film while it was in theatres, gave the film 1.5 stars out of 4, stating that the movie was, "a stiff and awkward story, interrupted by dance sequences of astonishing grace and power." Ebert praised the dancing and the chemistry of the stars but slammed the movie's screenplay and supporting characters.Breakin currently holds a 33% rating on Rotten Tomatoes based on nine reviews.

Home media
On August 5, 2003, MGM Home Entertainment released Breakin on DVD. On April 21, 2015, Shout! Factory released Breakin, along with its sequel, Breakin' 2: Electric Boogaloo, as a double feature Blu-ray.

In popular culture
Several months prior to the film's release, Shabba Doo, Boogaloo Shrimp, Pop n' Taco, Popin' Pete, DJ Chris "The Glove" Taylor and Lollipop were all prominently featured in the music video for Chaka Khan's remake of the 1979 Prince song, "I Feel for You".

Ice-T, who had a small role in both Breakin and its sequel Breakin' 2: Electric Boogaloo and was prominently featured on the soundtrack to both films (helping introduce his music to a worldwide audience), was quoted as saying he considers the film and his own performance in it to be "wack".Breakin' and its sequel have had a resurgence in popular media as people have begun to remember, mock, and praise the film over 20 years later, with the sequel's subtitle in particular becoming a snowclone pejorative nickname to denote an archetypical sequel.

In 2019, the documentary Boogaloo Shrimp by Taylor Golonka was released on Amazon Prime. It focuses on the creative talents of Michael Chambers, who played Turbo in Breakin'''. According to filmmaker Taylor Golonka, "Michael Chambers will go down in history as being one of the iconic innovators of the b-boy and breakdancing culture."

References

Bibliography

External links
 
 
 
 
 
 

1984 films
1980s musical comedy-drama films
1980s romantic comedy-drama films
American romantic comedy-drama films
American coming-of-age comedy-drama films
1980s dance films
American dance films
American independent films
American musical comedy-drama films
American romantic musical films
1980s English-language films
Films set in Los Angeles
Films shot in Los Angeles
1980s hip hop films
Golan-Globus films
Metro-Goldwyn-Mayer films
United Artists films
1980s coming-of-age comedy-drama films
1984 independent films
Breakdancing films
Films directed by Joel Silberg
1980s American films